The North Casper Clubhouse at 1032 East L Street in Casper, Wyoming is a relatively rare example of rammed earth construction in Wyoming.  It was built in 1938 by the National Youth Administration, a depression-era works organization.  The design was by Casper architects Goodrich and Krusmark.  It served as a clubhouse.

The building was listed on the National Register of Historic Places in 1994.

References

External links

Buildings and structures completed in 1938
Buildings and structures in Casper, Wyoming
Clubhouses on the National Register of Historic Places in Wyoming
National Register of Historic Places in Natrona County, Wyoming
New Deal in Wyoming
Pueblo Revival architecture
National Youth Administration
Rammed earth buildings and structures